There were eight special elections in 1891 in the United States House of Representatives to the 52nd United States Congress.

List of elections 

|-
| 
| Francis B. Spinola
|  | Democratic
| 
|  | Incumbent died April 14, 1891.New member elected November 3, 1891.Democratic hold.Successor seated December 7, 1891.
| nowrap | 

|-
| 
| Melbourne H. Ford
|  | Democratic
| 
|  | Incumbent died April 20, 1891.New member elected November 3, 1891.Republican gain.Successor seated December 7, 1891.
| nowrap | 

|-
| 
| Leonidas C. Houk
|  | Republican
| 
|  | Incumbent died May 25, 1891.New member elected November 21, 1891.Republican hold.Successor seated December 7, 1891.
| nowrap | 

|-
| 
| John R. Gamble
|  | Republican
| 
|  | Incumbent died August 14, 1891.New member elected November 3, 1891.Republican hold.Successor seated December 7, 1891.
| nowrap | 

|-
| 
| Leslie W. Russell
|  | Democratic
| 
|  | Incumbent resigned September 11, 1891.New member elected November 3, 1891 when elected judge of the New York Supreme Court.Republican gain.Successor seated December 7, 1891.
| nowrap | 

|-
| 
| Roswell P. Flower
|  | Democratic
| 
|  | Incumbent resigned September 16, 1891 to run for Governor of New York.New member elected November 3, 1891.Democratic hold.Successor seated December 7, 1891.
| nowrap | 

|-
| 
| David A. Boody
|  | Democratic
| 
|  | Incumbent resigned October 13, 1891, to run for Mayor of Brooklyn, New York.New member elected November 3, 1891.Democratic hold.Successor seated December 7, 1891.
| nowrap | 

|-
| 
| William H. F. Lee
|  | Democratic
| 
|  | Incumbent died October 15, 1891.New member elected December 9, 1891.Democratic hold.Successor seated December 23, 1891.
| nowrap | 

|}

Notes

References 

 
1891